The Germany women's national under-23 volleyball team represents Germany in international women's volleyball competitions and friendly matches under the age 23 and it is ruled by the German Volleyball Association That is an affiliate of International Volleyball Federation FIVB and also a part of European Volleyball Confederation CEV.

Results

FIVB U23 World Championship
 Champions   Runners up   Third place   Fourth place

Team

Current squad

References

External links
Official website 

National women's under-23 volleyball teams
Volleyball in Germany
Volleyball